Engelsmanplaat, or De Kalkman which is its local name, is a small sandbank between the Dutch islands Ameland and Schiermonnikoog.

References

External links 
 

Islands of Friesland
Sandbanks of the North Sea
Uninhabited islands of the Netherlands
West Frisian Islands
Shoals of the Netherlands